El Attaf is a town in northern Algeria, located in the wilaya (province) of Aïn Defla.

Communes of Aïn Defla Province
Aïn Defla Province